The Soo Line High Bridge, also known as the Arcola High Bridge, is a steel deck arch bridge over the St. Croix River between Stillwater, Minnesota and Somerset, Wisconsin, United States. It was designed by structural engineer C.A.P. Turner and built by the American Bridge Company from 1910 to 1911. The bridge was listed on the National Register of Historic Places in 1977 for its national significance in the themes of engineering and transportation. It was nominated for its exceptional dimensions, beauty, innovative engineering techniques, and importance to transportation between Minnesota and Wisconsin.

History

The bridge was the second bridge on a Wisconsin Central Railway line that connecting Chippewa Falls, Wisconsin, with Minneapolis, Minnesota. The line was originally built in 1884. The crossing of the St. Croix River was difficult for the railway, since the original bridge across the river was very low and trains had to contend with steep grades on both sides of the river. This made it necessary to use helper engines and to make trains shorter. In 1909 the Wisconsin Central Railway built a higher bridge over the river.

The Wisconsin Central Railway was leased by the Minneapolis, St. Paul and Sault Ste. Marie Railway in 1909. In 1961 the Minneapolis, St. Paul and Sault Ste. Marie Railway, Wisconsin Central Railway and the Duluth, South Shore and Atlantic Railway merged to form the Soo Line Railroad. After the Soo Line Railroad acquired the Chicago, Milwaukee, St. Paul and Pacific Railroad, it shifted Chicago–Minneapolis traffic to that railroad's superior mainline. In 1987 the bridge and much of the Soo Line's track in Wisconsin became part of the new Wisconsin Central Ltd. The Wisconsin Central was acquired by Canadian National Railway on January 30, 2001.

See also
 List of bridges on the National Register of Historic Places in Minnesota
 List of bridges on the National Register of Historic Places in Wisconsin
 National Register of Historic Places listings in St. Croix County, Wisconsin
 National Register of Historic Places listings in Washington County, Minnesota

References

External links
 

1911 establishments in Wisconsin
1911 establishments in Minnesota
Bridges completed in 1911
Railroad bridges on the National Register of Historic Places in Minnesota
Railway bridges on the National Register of Historic Places in Wisconsin
Buildings and structures in St. Croix County, Wisconsin
Transportation buildings and structures in Washington County, Minnesota
Open-spandrel deck arch bridges in the United States
National Register of Historic Places in St. Croix County, Wisconsin
Railroad bridges in Minnesota
Railroad bridges in Wisconsin
Soo Line Railroad
Transportation in St. Croix County, Wisconsin
Viaducts in the United States
Steel bridges in the United States
Bridges over the St. Croix River (Wisconsin–Minnesota)